Negahneewin College is a tertiary education institution aimed at the indigenous people in Northwestern Ontario, Canada. Aboriginal institutes partner with colleges and universities to offer students degree programs, apprenticeships, certificate programs and diploma programs.

Negahneewin is an Anishnawbe word that means "leading the way". Negahneewin College of Academic & Community Development is a college "within and throughout" Confederation College in Thunder Bay.

Programs 
 
Diploma Programs
Aboriginal Law and Advocacy

General Arts and Science
Certificate Programs
Native Child & Family
Aboriginal Transition
General Arts and Science
Pre-Health Sciences
Pre-Technology

References

External links
 
 Aboriginal Institutes

Colleges in Ontario
Education in Thunder Bay
First Nations education
Indigenous universities and colleges in North America
First Nations in Ontario